The third season of My Hero Academia anime television series was produced by Bones and directed by Kenji Nagasaki, with Yōsuke Kuroda handling series composition, Yoshihiko Umakoshi providing character designs and Yuki Hayashi composed the music. Like the rest of the series, it adapts Kōhei Horikoshi's original manga series of the same name from the rest of the 8th volume through the beginning of the 14th volume over 25 episodes. It covers the "Forest Training Camp" (chapters 70–83), "Hideout Raid" (chapters 84–97), "Provisional Hero License Exam" (chapters 98–121), and the beginning of "Shie Hassaikai" arc (chapters 122–124). The season ran from April 7 to September 29, 2018, on ytv and NTV in Japan.

The season follows Izuku Midoriya and his classmates from U.A. High, a prestigious high school for heroes in training. The students facing their struggles and challenges as they fight for their survival during a training camp and a quest to save one of their classmates. Later, the students preparing for their Provisional Hero License Exam, becoming that much closer to a full-fledged Heroes and take part of their Hero Work-Studies.

Toho released the season on DVD and Blu-ray in eight compilations, each containing two to four episodes, between July 18, 2018, and February 13, 2019. Funimation licensed the season for an English-language release in North America and released the first compilation on May 7, 2019. FunimationNow is streaming the season in Simuldub, while Crunchyroll and Hulu are simulcasting outside of Asia as it airs. Funimation's adaptation ran from March 3, 2019, to August 18, 2019 on Adult Swim's Toonami block.

Four pieces of theme music are used for this season: two opening themes and two ending themes.


Episode list

Home video release

Japanese
Toho released the third season of the anime on DVD and Blu-ray in eight volumes in Japan, with the first volume being released on July 18, 2018, and the final volume being released on February 13, 2019.

English
Funimation released the series in North America in two volumes, with the first volume released on May 7, 2019, and the second volume on September 3, 2019. The first volume received a limited edition combo release, along with a standard edition combo release, and a standard edition DVD release. Both volumes received a DVD/Blu-ray release on November 10, 2020. In the United Kingdom and Ireland, Manga Entertainment is distributing the series for Funimation, releasing the first part in a limited edition combo release, along with a standard edition DVD and Blu-ray, on May 13, 2019, and the second part on September 9, 2019. In Australia and New Zealand, Madman Entertainment is distributing the series for Funimation, scheduling the first part for release in standard and limited editions on August 7, 2019, and the second part on November 6, 2019.

Notes

References

My Hero Academia episode lists
2018 Japanese television seasons